Goldfield is an unincorporated small desert city and the county seat of Esmeralda County, Nevada. 

It is the locus of the Goldfield CDP which had a resident population of 268 at the 2010 census, down from 440 in 2000.

Goldfield was a boomtown in the first decade of the 20th century due to the discovery of gold – between 1903 and 1940, Goldfield's mines produced more than $86 million at then-current prices. Much of the town was destroyed by a fire in 1923, although several buildings survived and remain today, notably the Goldfield Hotel, the Consolidated Mines Building (the communications center of the town until 1963), and the schoolhouse. Gold exploration continues in and around the town today.

History

The community was named for deposits of gold near the original town site. Gold was discovered at Goldfield in 1902, its year of inception. By 1904, the Goldfield district produced about 800 tons of ore, valued at $2,300,000, 30% of the state's production that year. This remarkable production caused Goldfield to grow rapidly, and it soon became the largest town in the state with about 20,000 people.

One prominent, or notorious, early Goldfield resident was George Graham Rice, a former check forger, newspaperman, and racetrack tipster, turned mining stock promoter. The collapse of his Sullivan Trust Company and its associated mining stocks caused the failure of the Goldfield State Bank in 1907. Rice quickly left Goldfield, but continued to promote mining shares for another quarter-century.

Another prominent resident from 1906 was George Wingfield, one of Nevada's entrepreneurs, who built the Goldfield Hotel. George S. Nixon and Wingfield made huge fortunes in Goldfield by forming the Goldfield Consolidated Mining Company. By 1906, they were worth $30 million.

Wingfield moved to Reno soon after realizing his great wealth could be spread across northern Nevada and northern California.
Between 1903 and 1918, mining in the two towns grew from $2.8 million to $48.6 million.

Wyatt and Virgil Earp came to Goldfield in 1904. Virgil was hired as a Goldfield deputy sheriff in January 1905. In April, he contracted pneumonia and, after six months of illness, he died on October 19, 1905. Wyatt Earp left Goldfield shortly afterward.

Goldfield reached a peak population around 20,000 people in 1906 and hosted a lightweight boxing championship match between Joe Gans and Oscar "Battling" Nelson.

In addition to the mines, Goldfield was home to large reduction works. The gold output in 1907 was over $8.4 million, the year in which the town became the county seat; in 1908, output was about $4,880,000. In the early 1900s, Consolidated Mining dug an adit at Alkali, Nevada to deliver water  to the 100-stamp Combination Mill near Goldfield.

By the 1910 census, its population had declined to 4,838. Part of the problem was the increasing cost of pumping brine out of the diggings, making them uneconomic. By 1912, ore production had dropped to $5 million, and the largest mining company left town in 1919. In 1923, a fire caused by a moonshine still explosion destroyed most of the town's flammable buildings. Some brick and stone buildings from before the fire remain, including the hotel and the high school.

Labor relations during the boom years 

Soon after mining on an extensive scale began, the miners organized themselves as a local branch of the Western Federation of Miners, and in this branch were included many laborers in Goldfield other than miners. Between this branch and the mine owners, serious differences arose, and several strikes occurred in December 1906 and January 1907 for higher wages.

In March and April 1907, because the owners refused to discharge carpenters who were members of the American Federation of Labor, but did not belong to the Western Federation of Miners or to the Industrial Workers of the World affiliated with it, this last organization was, as a result of the strike, forced out of Goldfield, despite at one point counting the 1,500 miners as well as hundreds of white-collar and service workers as members. 

This defeat came after a bitter struggle which saw IWW organizer Vincent St. John first imprisoned and charged with conspiracy, then shot in the street by a gunman on November 5 along with two other IWW members.

Beginning in August 1907, a rule was introduced at some of the mines requiring miners to change their clothing before entering and after leaving the mines – a rule made necessary, according to the operators, by the wholesale stealing (in miners' parlance, "high-grading") of the very valuable ore (some of it valued at as high as $20 a pound). In November and December 1907, some of the owners adopted a system of paying in cashier's checks. Except for occasional attacks upon nonunion workmen, or upon persons supposed not to be in sympathy with the miners' union, no serious disturbance in Goldfield occurred, but in December 1907, Governor Sparks, at the insistence of the mine owners, appealed to President Theodore Roosevelt to send federal troops to Goldfield, on the grounds that the situation there was ominous, that destruction of life and property seemed probable, and that the state had no militia and would be powerless to maintain order.

President Roosevelt on December 4, 1907 ordered General Frederick Funston, commanding the Division of California, at San Francisco, to proceed with 300 federal troops to Goldfield. The troops arrived in Goldfield on December 6, and immediately afterwards, the mine owners reduced wages and announced that no members of the Western Federation of Miners would thereafter be employed in the mines. Roosevelt, becoming convinced that conditions had not warranted Sparks's appeal for assistance, but that the immediate withdrawal of the troops might lead to serious disorder, consented that they should remain for a short time on condition that the state should immediately organize an adequate militia or police force. Accordingly, a special meeting of the legislature was immediately called, a state police force was organized, and on March 7, 1908, the troops were withdrawn. Thereafter, work was gradually resumed in the mines, the contest having been won by the mine-owners.

Climate
Goldfield's climate is arid (Köppen climate classification BWk), bordering on semiarid.

An average of 29 days have measurable precipitation.

Demographics

The population decline continued throughout the 20th century and, by 1950, Goldfield had a population of only 275.

The 2000 census showed 440 people, 221 households, and 118 families resided in the Goldfield census county division.  The racial makeup of the CCD was 93.2% White, 0.2% Black or African American, 2.0% Native American, 0.2% Pacific Islander, 1.4% from other races, and 3.0% from two or more races.  About 5.2% of the population was Hispanic or Latino of any race.

Present-day attractions
While the unoccupied buildings of the town remain an attraction, they are not abandoned. Each building has an owner, many with plans to renovate the property. In addition, the Goldfield Days festival is held in August each year. The festival includes parades, booths, historical displays, and a land auction.

Among the buildings located within the Goldfield Historic District are:
 The 1906–08 Goldfield High School, which survived the fire of 1923/24, is in poor condition, but the Goldfield Historical Society has received a matching grant of $296,000 from the National Park Service under the Save America's Treasures Grant Program.
 Esmeralda County Courthouse
 The 1907–1908 Goldfield Hotel at Crook Avenue (U.S. 95) and Columbia Street has remained unoccupied since the end of World War II.

Education
Residents are zoned to the Esmeralda County School District for grades K-8.

High school students in the entire county go to Tonopah High School of Nye County School District.

Notable people
Ben Alexander, actor
Samuel Langhorne Clemens
Doris Dawson, actress
Brad Dexter, actor
Virgil Earp, deputy sheriff
Joseph Rosenberg, banker and miner
George Wingfield, banker and miner

In popular culture
Parts of the cult classic 1971 car chase movie Vanishing Point were filmed in Goldfield, and it was the site of the fictitious radio station "KOW", and the DJ "Super-Soul".

Parts of Goldfield, and also parts of nearby Tonopah, Nevada, served as the fictional town of Baxter, California in the 1998 film Desert Blue.

The town was featured in two episodes of State Trooper, Rod Cameron's syndicated television series that aired from 1956 to 1959.

In the 1988 movie  Cherry 2000, Goldfield was used as the set of the fictional town of Glory Hole.

The 1995 movie The Stranger was filmed in and around Goldfield.

An abbreviated depiction of Goldfield is featured in the video game American Truck Simulator.

See also

Goldfield Hills
Tonopah and Goldfield Railroad
Tonopah and Tidewater Railroad

Notes

References
Rinella, Heidi Knapp, Off the Beaten Path: Nevada, Guildford, CT: Globe Pequot Press, 2007. ISSN 1537-3304
Thomson, David, In Nevada: The Land, The People, God, and Chance, New York: Vintage Books, 2000.

External links

 Goldfield Chamber of Commerce
 Esmeralda County, Nevada.gov: Information on Goldfield – from official county website
 KUED.org: "The Goldfield Strike"  – from KUED public broadcasting
 Library of Congress.gov: Historic HAER/HABS photographs of Goldfield
 AllaroundNevada.com:  Panoramic view of Goldfield in 1909 – with virtual-reality exploration of interior of the Goldfield Hotel
 Archive.org:  "Goldfield, Nevada: The scene of great gold discoveries" – from  The National Magazine (Vol.XXI, October 1904 − March 1905)

 
1902 establishments in Nevada
Census-designated places in Esmeralda County, Nevada
Census-designated places in Nevada
County seats in Nevada
History of Esmeralda County, Nevada
Industrial Workers of the World in Nevada
Mining communities in Nevada
Populated places established in 1902